Hesar-e Abd ol Karim (also Romanized as Ḩesār-e ‘Abd ol Karīm, Ḩeşār-e ‘Abd ol Karīm, and Ḩeşār ‘Abd ol Karīm; also known as Gisar, Ḩeşār, and Hisār) is a village in Howmeh Rural District, in the Central District of Abhar County, Zanjan Province, Iran. At the 2006 census, its population was 64, in 16 families.

References 

Populated places in Abhar County